Jazmín Tatiana Pinedo Chau (born Junín, Peru, 19 August 1990) is a television presenter, television personality and former model. She is a former host of the Esto es Guerra reality show on América Televisión and Espectáculos on Latina Televisión.

Early life 

Pinedo was born in Lima, Peru, and is the only child of Teódulo Santiago Pinedo, Commander of the National Police of Peru, and Libertad Chau.

Artistic career
Pinedo started modelling for tourism agencies in Junin. In 2005, she was elected Miss Selva Central, and in 2006 she won second place in Miss Junin.

After being crowned Miss Teen Perú 2008, she signed as a model for the Very Verano of América Televisión contest program.

In 2011, Pinedo made her acting debut in the movie El Buen Pedro, which premiered in 2017 and was directed by Sandro Ventura. In Somos Néctar, she played Korina.

In 2012, she collaborated with model, Tilsa Lozano.

In 2013, she entered the reality show Esto es Guerra, and retired in 2015 when she became pregnant. That same year, she made her debut as a presenter in the contest show Combate, with actors Renzo Schuller and Gian Piero Díaz in ATV. In 2016, Pinedo joined Latina Televisión in Espectáculos, succeeding Karen Schwarz. Shortly thereafter, she co-hosted Los Reyes del Playback with Jesús Alzamora and Cristian Rivero. She also presented the talent show Yo Soy.

In 2018, she traveled to Italy to work for the Bata shoe brand, and joined the cast of the telenovela Torbellino, 20 Years Later, playing Miriam Saavedra. She also presented El Ultimo Hincha Peruano and was a reporter in the 2018 FIFA World Cup. In September of the same year, she presented Tengo Algo Que Decirte as a substitute for lawyer and ex-dancer, Lady Guillén, who was on maternity leave.  She also presented the dance show Los Cuatro Finalistas: Baile.

Pinedo released a cumbia version of the Luis Fonsi and Demi Lovato single Échame la Culpa, with singer Deyvis Orosco.

In 2019, she presented the remake of Espectáculos through the end of April, and then the morning show Mujeres la mando with Karen Schwarz and Magdyel Ugaz on Latina. She presented the show Guerra with Gianpiero Díaz on América Television until 2021, when she was replaced by Johanna San Miguel.

Personal life
In 2012, Pinedo had a relationship with actor, Jesús Neyra. 

In 2017, in an interview for the newspaper La República, she described herself as "hermetic" in her social relationships. In 2018, upon her return from covering the 2018 FIFA World Cup, Pinedo decided to take a work break to undergo surgical treatment and recover.

Controversies

2018 World Cup 
In 2018, the manager of Latina Televisión reported that Pinedo was to travel to the World Cup to cover the event, generating criticism of her journalistic and sporting inexperience. Pinedo made it clear that she would not go to the World Cup to cover news about soccer, but to cover incidents relating to the World Cup and the Perú national soccer team.

Change of television network 
In 2020, Pinedo left Latina Televisión for América Televisión to become a presenter for Esto es Guerra, generating criticism on social media networks. The controversy grew when it was discovered that her contract with Latina had not yet expired. She was sued for S/ 450,000.00 for breach of contract. Afterwards, Latina revealed Pinedo's salary, which sparked the indignation of many viewers who referred to it as a "slap in the face of poverty".

Filmography

Awards and nominations

References 

Peruvian female models
People from Junín Region
1990 births
Living people
21st-century Peruvian women singers
21st-century Peruvian singers
Peruvian film actresses
Peruvian female dancers
Peruvian women television presenters